Valetoniellopsis is a genus of fungi within the Niessliaceae family. This is a monotypic genus, containing the single species Valetoniellopsis laxa.

References

External links
Valetoniellopsis at Index Fungorum

Niessliaceae
Monotypic Sordariomycetes genera